Țiglari is a district of Sibiu, Romania, situated in the northern part of the city. Its name is given by the former tile factory that was situated in this part of the city.

References

Districts of Sibiu